The 2016 ASUN women's soccer tournament was a postseason women's soccer tournament that ended the 2016 season of the ASUN Conference. It was held from October 29 to November 6, 2016 and consisted of five matches at campus sites, with the higher seed hosting. The six team single-elimination tournament consisted of three rounds based on seeding from regular season conference play. The FGCU Eagles were the defending tournament champions, after defeating the Lipscomb Bisons 5–0 in the championship match for the program's fourth league title.

This was the first tournament held under the conference's current branding as the ASUN Conference. The league had been known as the Atlantic Sun Conference since 2002.

Bracket

Schedule

First round

Semifinals

Final

References

External links 
2016 ASUN Women's Soccer Championship

 
ASUN Women's Soccer Tournament
College women's soccer competitions in the United States
Women's soccer in the United States